The Fiji women's national under-20 football team is the second highest women's youth team of women's football in Fiji and is controlled by the Fiji Football Association.

History
Fiji participated so far three times at the OFC U-19 Women's Championship. In 2002 and 2006 they were eliminated in the group stages. At their third participation, in 2017, they became second.

In 2002 Fiji draw their first ever game at this level, a 0–0 against American Samoa.  They fought for their first win but it wasn't ment to be after two losses: a 2–1 against Samoa and a 8–0 against New Zealand.

In 2006 Fiji were again searching for their first win ever. They had to wait for their final group game, but they got it in the end. After two defeats against again Samoa (3-0) and a heavy 6–1 against Papua New Guinea they won by 3 goals to nil against New Caledonia. Savaia Ratu was the top scorer of the tournament with two goals.

After reaching the goal of winning their first game there was more to celebrate nine years later, in 2017. Fiji became second after three wins, a draw and only one loss against football giants New Zealand. Fiji managed to get the victory's against Tonga (4-0), Papua New Guinea (3-2) and again New Caledonia (2-1). Fiji managed to score a lot of goals with Luisa Tamanitoakula scoring seven goals and Cema Nasau who scored four goals. Although Fiji scored a total of 12 goals, they still had a negative goal scoring tally with conceding 14 goals. Most of those goals were against New Zealand, after that ended in 9–1 loss.

Records

OFC Championship Record

Current technical staff

Current squad
The following players were called up for the 2019 OFC U-19 Women's Championship from 30 August–12 September in Avarua, the Cook Islands.

Caps and goals updated as of 6 September 2019, after the game against Vanuatu.

2017 squad
The following players were called up for the 2017 OFC U-19 Women's Championship

Caps and goals correct after match against New Caledonia on July 24, 2017.

References

External links
Fiji Football Federation page
Oceania Football Federation page

Oceanian women's national under-20 association football teams
women's